The 1975–76 United Counties League season was the 69th in the history of the United Counties League, a football competition in England.

Premier Division

The Premier Division featured 18 clubs which competed in the division last season, along with two new clubs, promoted from Division One:
Olney Town
Stewart & Lloyds Corby

League table

Division One

The Division One featured 14 clubs which competed in the division last season, along with 4 new clubs:
Leighton Town, relegated from the Premier Division
Geddington Montrose, promoted from Division Two 
Buckingham Town, promoted from Division Two
Kempston Rovers reserves, promoted from Division Two

League table

Division Two

The Division Two featured 17 clubs which competed in the division last season, along with 3 new clubs:
Byfield Athletic
Wolverton Town reserves
St Neots Town reserves

League table

References

External links
 United Counties League

1975–76 in English football leagues
United Counties League seasons